Nehemitropia is a genus of rove beetles in the family Staphylinidae. There are at least two described species in Nehemitropia.

Species
These two species belong to the genus Nehemitropia:
 Nehemitropia lividipennis (Mannerheim, 1830)
 Nehemitropia taiwanorum Pace, 2009

References

Further reading

External links

 

Aleocharinae
Articles created by Qbugbot